To You All is the second studio album by the Swiss hard rock band Krokus, released in 1977. The line-up of Krokus changed radically from their debut album as founding members Chris von Rohr and Tommy Kiefer were joined by Fernando von Arb, Jürg Naegeli, and Freddy Steady, previously active as a trio under the name Montezuma. It was the first album to feature the Krokus logo on the cover and their first video clip was shot for "Highway Song". To You All had limited success in Switzerland.

Track listing

Personnel
Band members
Chris von Rohr - lead and backing vocals, keyboards, percussion, drums, bass
Tommy Kiefer - lead guitar, backing and lead vocals
Fernando von Arb - rhythm guitar, bass, keyboards, backing vocals
Jürg Naegeli - bass, keyboards, backing vocals
Freddy Steady - drums, percussion, backing vocals

Additional musicians
Chicken Fisher - guitar (4), vocals (10)
Peter Richard - vocals (4, 5, 7)
Remo Spadino - bass (4, 5, 7, 10)
Hichi Szabo - keyboards (10)
Ben Jeger - organ (8)

References

Krokus (band) albums
1977 albums